The Kad is a river in Perm Krai, Russia, a left tributary of the Yayva. It starts on the west slope of the Ural Mountains, to the west of Mount Cherdynsky Kamen, in Sverdlovsk Oblast. There are small tributaries, the most significant of which are Plyasovaya (10 km), Kedrovaya (11 km), Samara (11 km).

References 

Rivers of Perm Krai